West Punjab was a province in the Dominion of Pakistan from 1947 to 1955. The province covered an area of 159,344 km2 (61523 sq mi), including much of the current Punjab province and the Islamabad Capital Territory, but excluding the former Princely state of Bahawalpur. The capital was the city of Lahore and the province was composed of four divisions (Lahore, Sargodha, Multan and Rawalpindi). The province was bordered by the princely state of Bahawalpur to the south, the province of Baluchistan to the south-west and Sind to the south, North-West Frontier Province to the northwest, and Azad Kashmir to the north. It shared International border with Indian state of East Punjab and Indian-administered Jammu & Kashmir to the east. It acceeded to West Pakistan upon creation of One Unit Scheme.

History
The creation of Pakistan in 1947 led to the division of the Punjab Province of British India into two new provinces. The largely Sikh and Hindu East Punjab became part of the new nation of India while the largely Muslim West Punjab became part of the new nation of the Dominion of Pakistan. The name of the province was shortened to Punjab in 1950. West Punjab was merged into the province of West Pakistan in 1955 under the One Unit policy announced by Prime Minister Chaudhary Muhammad Ali. When that province was dissolved, the area of the former province of West Punjab was combined with the former state of Bahawalpur to form a new Punjab Province.

Government
The offices of Governor of West Punjab and Chief Minister of West Punjab lasted from 15 August 1947, until 14 October 1955. The first Governor was Sir Francis Mudie with Iftikhar Hussain Khan as the first Chief Minister. Both offices were abolished in 1955, when the province of West Pakistan was created. The last Governor of West Punjab, Mushtaq Ahmad Gurmani, became the first Governor of West Pakistan.

Demographics

Religion 

At Independence there was a Muslim majority in West Punjab with a significant Hindu and Sikh minority. Nearly all of these minorities left West Punjab for India, to be replaced by large numbers of Muslims fleeing from the opposite direction.

Language 
The official language of West Punjab was Urdu but most of the population spoke Punjabi. The linguist George Abraham Grierson in his multi volume Linguistic Survey of India (1904–1928) considered the various dialects up to then called "Western Punjabi", spoken in North, West, and South of Lahore in what is now Pakistani Punjab, as constituting instead a distinct language from Punjabi. (The local dialect of Lahore is the Majhi dialect of Punjabi, which has long been the basis of standard literary Punjabi.) Grierson proposed to name this putative language "Lahnda", and he dubbed as "Southern Lahnda" the coherent dialect cluster now known as Saraiki spoken in Multan Dera Ghazi Khan and Bahawalpur division and "North Lahnda" now known as Potwari spoken in Rawalpindi division and "Western Lahnda" now known as Hindko spoken in the regions bordering Khyber-Pakhtunkhwa.

Contemporary usage
The term is often used to refer to the Pakistani Punjab.

See also
History of Punjab
 Punjab region
 Punjab (Pakistan)
 Punjab (India)
 Haryana
 Bahawalpur State

Notes

References

External links

 Government of Punjab
 Punjab Provincial Assembly Records 
 Population at 1951 census by Statoids.com

1947 establishments in Pakistan
1955 disestablishments in Pakistan
States and territories established in 1947
States and territories disestablished in 1955
Former subdivisions of Pakistan
Punjab